Fausto Cattaneo is an Italian physicist, currently at University of Chicago and an Elected Fellow of the American Physical Society.

References

Year of birth missing (living people)
Living people
Fellows of the American Physical Society
21st-century American physicists
University of Chicago faculty